Floyd Salas (January 24, 1931 – October 17, 2021) was an American novelist, social activist, boxer and boxing coach. His work is well known in the San Francisco Bay Area and among aficionados of both Latino literature and 60s era protest literature.

He was a cofounder of PEN Oakland in 1989, and he won a 2013 lifetime achievement American Book Award from the Before Columbus Foundation.

Salas died after a long illness in Berkeley, California, on October 17, 2021, at the age of 90. He was survived by his wife, the writer Claire Ortalda, and a son.

Bibliography

References

External links

Tribute 

1931 births
2021 deaths
American Book Award winners
American fiction writers
PEN Oakland/Josephine Miles Literary Award winners
People from Walsenburg, Colorado